Maksim Vladimirovich Vasilyev (born 31 January 1987) is a Russian former professional footballer who played as a centre back.

Club career
He made his Russian Football National League debut for Baltika Kaliningrad on 12 March 2013 in a game against FC Khimki.

External links
 
 

1987 births
Footballers from Saint Petersburg
Living people
Russian footballers
Association football defenders
FC Torpedo-BelAZ Zhodino players
FC Volga Nizhny Novgorod players
FF Jaro players
FC Baltika Kaliningrad players
FC Yenisey Krasnoyarsk players
FC Rotor Volgograd players
FC Armavir players
FC Dynamo Bryansk players
Veikkausliiga players
Belarusian Premier League players
Russian expatriate footballers
Expatriate footballers in Belarus
Expatriate footballers in Finland